Friedrich Panse (31 December 1899 in Essen – 6 December 1973 in Bochum) was a German psychiatrist who was involved with the Nazi T-4 Euthanasia Program. He was an advisor who "expertly guided" patients into gas chambers.

See also 
Racial policy of Nazi Germany
Werner Heyde
 Ralf Forsbach: Biography of Friedrich Albert Panse In: Biographical Archive of Psychiatry (BIAPSY), 2018.

1899 births
1973 deaths
Legal history of Germany
German psychiatrists
Physicians in the Nazi Party
Aktion T4 personnel